Ipinda is an administrative ward in the Kyela district of the Mbeya Region of Tanzania. In 2016 the Tanzania National Bureau of Statistics report there were 22,976 people in the ward, from 20,847 in 2012.

Villages / vitongoji 
The ward has 11 villages and 29 vitongoji.

 Bujela
 Bujela
 Lupaso
 Ikumbilo
 Ikumbilo
 Kalulya
 Ikulu
 Ikulu Kanisani
 Ikulu Kusini
 Ipinda
 Ipinda Kaskazini
 Ipinda Kati
 Ipinda Kusini
 Kafundo
 Kafundo Kaskazini
 Kafundo Kati
 Kafundo Kusini
 Kanga
 Kanga A
 Kanga B
 Mwangulu
 Kiingili
 Kingili A
 Kingili B
 Lukuju
 Mahenge
 Kisale
 Iringa
 Mbangamoyo
 Lupaso
 Kanyelele
 Lupaso
 Mabunga
 Mbamila
 Mpunguti
 Nsongola
 Ngamanga
 Ibungu
 Mitugutu
 Ngamanga Kati

References 

Wards of Mbeya Region